Crowell Willson (1815 – October 12, 1894) was a Canadian farmer and political figure. He represented Middlesex East in the House of Commons of Canada as a Liberal-Conservative member from 1867 to 1872 and in 1874.

He was born in St. Thomas, Upper Canada in 1815, the son of Benjamin Willson. In 1838, he settled in London Township and established a wool carding mill there. In 1851, he was elected to represent Middlesex in the Legislative Assembly of the Province of Canada; he was reelected in East Middlesex in 1863. He was elected to the federal parliament in 1867 and 1874 but, in 1874, he was unseated after his election was protested. Willson was also a director of the London Mutual Fire Insurance Company.

In 1843, Willson married Maria Jackson. He died in Wingham at the age of 79.

References 

1815 births
1894 deaths
Conservative Party of Canada (1867–1942) MPs
Members of the House of Commons of Canada from Ontario
Members of the Legislative Assembly of the Province of Canada from Canada West
People from St. Thomas, Ontario